Ha-young or Ha-yeong, is a given name.

People
Notable people with the name include:

Ha-young
 Shin Ha-young (born 1993), South Korean actress and model, also known mononymously as Ha-Young
 Song Ha-young, South Korean singer of Fromis 9
 Oh Ha-young (born 1996), known by the mononym Hayoung, South Korean singer and actress
 Hayoung, a member of the Zoo Entertainment girlgroup Badkiz
 Hayoung, a member of the TS Entertainment boyband TRCNG

Ha-yeong
 Yi Ha-yeong; Minister of Justice for the Korean Empire at the end of its independence from Japan
 Seong Hayeong, a Korean commander during the 1894-1895 Donghak Peasant Revolution
 O Ha-yeong, a South Korean politician; see List of members of the National Assembly (South Korea), 1950–1954
 Jang Hayeong (born 1986), convicted of child abuse murder that rose to national headlines in the death of Jeong-In

Fictional characters
 Do Ha-yeong, a character from The Return of Superman; see List of The Return of Superman episodes
 Ha-yeong, a character from the South Korean TV show Monstrous (TV series)